Patrick Parizon (born 3 June 1950, in Le Creusot, France) is a football manager. He was fired from coaching SM Caen in June 2009.

References
Notes

Sources
 Profile on French federation site

Living people
1950 births
French footballers
France international footballers
AS Saint-Étienne players
ES Troyes AC players
Lille OSC players
FC Sochaux-Montbéliard players
Stade Brestois 29 players
Ligue 1 players
French football managers
Chamois Niortais F.C. managers
Grenoble Foot 38 managers
FC Martigues managers
Ivory Coast national football team managers
Mauritius national football team managers
FC Rouen managers
Paris FC managers
Stade Malherbe Caen managers
Amiens SC managers
Sportspeople from Le Creusot
Association football forwards
Footballers from Bourgogne-Franche-Comté
French expatriate sportspeople in Ivory Coast
Expatriate football managers in Ivory Coast
French expatriate football managers